Gooische Vrouwen is a Dutch comedy-drama series, created by Linda de Mol for her brother John de Mol's TV network Tien in 2005, along the lines of Desperate Housewives or Sex and the City. After the show's second season, its original channel was acquired by RTL Nederland and Gooische Vrouwen was transferred to its flagship channel RTL 4, where it ran for three more seasons until its finale in 2009. After its 42-episode run the show was followed by a theatrically released feature film (also called Gooische Vrouwen) in 2011. The show chronicles the everyday lives of four female friends living in the Gooi.

Gooische Vrouwen has since been sold to Germany (for which version Linda de Mol dubbed her own voice), Belgium, France and Serbia.

Plot overview
The show chronicles the everyday lives of four female friends living in the Gooi (the Dutch equivalent of Beverly Hills).

Cheryl and her husband, charm singer Martin Morero, move from Amsterdam to the Gooi after the huge success of his latest song "Echte Liefde" (true love). However, the working-class Moreros soon realize they do not fit in with the upper-class residents of the Gooi. Other problems in the Moreros' life include Martin's constant philandering and their continued yet unsuccessful attempts at having a baby.

Housewife Willemijn Lodewijkx is married to Evert, with whom she has three children - bored Roderick, difficult Louise and timid Annabel. But after more than twenty years of marriage, they seem to be stuck. While Willemijn tries to keep her spirits up, her marriage disintegrates. After the third season, Willemijn is replaced by Roelien Grootheeze.

Free-spirited artist Anouk Verschuur specializes in making highly erotic art. Anouk herself is also blessed with a very healthy libido which leads her into the arms of many a stranger, although she is still not completely over her pilot ex-husband Tom Blaauw, with whom she has a daughter, precocious Vlinder.

Ruthless divorce lawyer Claire van Kampen is struck by personal tragedy which pushes her estranged daughter Merel even further away, while plunging the two into financial difficulties. Claire must come up with ever more drastic schemes to keep their heads above water.

The four women confide in each other and in their enigmatic psychiatrist Dr. Ed Rossi. Meanwhile, mysterious Thai au pair Tippi Wan seems to have an agenda of her own, manipulating and scheming her way into the lives of the four women.

Cast

Offshoots
The younger days of the four women are chronicled in a prequel-novel.
The success of Gooische Vrouwen inspired RTL 4 to make a real-life soap about a younger generation of women from the Gooi (De Echte Gooische Meisjes). For the second season, they temporarily relocated to Amsterdam where they were trained to deal with spending cuts. One of the girls went on to document her trip to Peru. 
A feature film, also called Gooische Vrouwen, was released theatrically in 2011.
A sequel film called Gooische Vrouwen 2 was released in December 2014.

Trivia
Interviewed for TV-guide AVRO Televizier in 2008, actress Cystine Carreon expressed her concern that Tippi Wan (who gave au pairs a bad name) will still haunt her in 20 years time.

External links
 

2005 Dutch television series debuts
Television series by Endemol
Dutch drama television series
2009 Dutch television series endings
2000s Dutch television series
Tien (TV channel) original programming